Jesse Johnson's Revue is the debut studio album from American R&B musician Jesse Johnson, released in 1985 via A&M Records. The album peaked at #43 on the Billboard 200 and at #8 on the Billboard R&B chart.

Three singles were released from the album: "Be Your Man", "Can You Help Me" and "I Want My Girl". "Be Your Man" was the most successful single from the album, peaking at #61 on the Billboard Hot 100 in 1985.

Track listing

Personnel
Jesse Johnson: Guitars, Vocals
Michael Baker: Guitars, Backing Vocals
Mark Cardenas, Tim Bradley: Keyboards, Backing Vocals
Gerry Hubbard: Bass, Backing Vocals
Bobby Vandell: Drums, Vocals

Production
Arranged and Produced by Jesse Johnson for JWJ Productions
Recorded and mixed by David Rivkin, Jesse Johnson and Peter Martinsen (Recorded and mixed at Jungle Love Studios)
Mastered by Bernie Grundman at Bernie Grundman Mastering
All songs published by Crazy People Music/Almo Music

Chart positions

References

External links
 

1985 debut albums
A&M Records albums
Jesse Johnson (musician) albums